

Overview 

All information came from the Secretary of State of Georgia Website.

General
At the time of the election, Georgia had 13 congressional districts whose lines were redrawn in 2005.  Each district is home to approximately 630,000 Georgia residents. In 2006, seven seats were held by Republicans and six seats were held by Democrats. Results for write in candidates can be found here.

District 1

General election results

|-
|colspan=6|Source: Georgia Secretary of State

District 2

General election results

|-
|colspan=6|Source: Georgia Secretary of State

District 3

General election results

|-
|colspan=6|Source: Georgia Secretary of State

District 4 

In the primary of July 18, incumbent Cynthia McKinney edged Johnson, a significant figure in DeKalb County politics, 47% to 45%.   Johnson subsequently defeated McKinney 59% to 41% in the August 8 runoff election.

General election results

|-
|colspan=6|Source: Georgia Secretary of State

District 5

General election results

|-
|colspan=6|Source: Georgia Secretary of State

District 6

General election results

|-
|colspan=6|Source: Georgia Secretary of State

District 7

General election results

|-
|colspan=6|Source: Georgia Secretary of State

District 8 

A Republican mid-decade redistricting made this Macon-based district more compact and somewhat more Republican. Democratic incumbent Jim Marshall faced a very tough challenge by former Congressman Mac Collins, who represented an adjoining district from 1993 to 2005. Less than 60 percent of the population in Marshall's present 3rd District was retained in the new 8th District. The reconfigured 8th includes Butts County, the political base of his opponent, former Congressman Mac Collins, who once served as chairman of the county commission. On the other hand, the 8th also includes all of Macon, where Marshall served as mayor from 1995 to 1999.  The race featured heavy spending, not only by the candidates themselves, but from independent groups. During the campaign, President George W. Bush attended a rally to try to help Collins. Marshall won reelection by some 1,700 votes.

Marshall was reelected with 63% in 2004, but in 2002 won by only 50.5% to 49.5%. This is one of the most competitive House races in the nation.

General election results

|-
|colspan=6|Source: Georgia Secretary of State

District 9

General election results

|-
|colspan=6|Source: Georgia Secretary of State

District 10

General election results

|-
|colspan=6|Source: Georgia Secretary of State

District 11

General election results

|-
|colspan=6|Source: Georgia Secretary of State

District 12 

Democrat John Barrow unseated first-term Republican Max Burns by 52% to 48% in a Democratic-leaning district which Burns won over a scandal-tainted opponent in 2002. This year, Burns sought a rematch. Recent redistricting made this southern Georgia district more mixed, but the balance still favored Democrats. Burns ran a tough campaign and made the race extremely close. In the end however Burns lost by 864 votes and ruled out a recount challenge to the certified results. This failure to win the seat by the GOP sealed the unprecedented gains of the Democrats in which they did not lose a single House seat, Senate Seat or Governorship they held going into the election.

General election results

|-
|colspan=6|Source: Georgia Secretary of State

District 13

General election results

|-
|colspan=6|Source: Georgia Secretary of State

Georgia
2006
Georgia